The Battle of Muriq was a battle between Albanian Malësors from Muriqi (near Shkodra), Skadarska Krajina, (present-day Montenegro) and Montenegrin forces led by Danilo I Petrović-Njegoš in 1861-1862. Montenegrin general Mirko Petrović's forces had planned an attack on the Muriqi region with captains Joko Kusovac, Đoko Pejović and Ilija Plamenac to expand the Principality of Montenegro. The Montenegrins from Krajë, Selca and Krricë were waiting to attack the northern part of Muriqi which was inhabited by Albanians. Captain Iljia Plamenac had 200 soldiers ready. On the other side, Savo Vujović planned an attack south of Muriqi with 400 men from Dupillo, Bercela and Salca. The Montenegrin priest Milo Vojvodić ordered his forces to block all roads from Bar so that reinforcements could not reach the Albanians in Muriqi. The Albanians were victorious in the battle of Muriq 1861

Background 
Krajë was the border area between Montenegro and Albania with the village of Cermnicë in the middle. According to Marjan Bolica, the villages extended to Lake Shkoder and beside Pashtrovice. Cermnica had two tribes, Cermica and Limnjan. During the 18th century, the tribes received help from Cetinje (then the capital of Montenegro) when they fought with the Albanians in Krajë. The border between the Ottoman Empire and Montenegro became clearer after being decided by the Technical Commission at the Conference of Ambassadors in Istanbul on October 8, 1859. The border ran at Vranjina and Lake Skadar, alongside the mountains Godenë and Selca (which were on the Ottoman side) and the line continued to Sutormani. The village of Pepiqi stayed within Montenegro. After the assassination of Danilo I Petrović-Njegoš on 31 August 1860, Prince Nikola I Petrović-Njegoš replaced him. The prince chose to expand further into Albanian territory. The border defenses of 1860 increased with the gathering forces of the king's commander, Vojvoda Mirko Petrović. The Kraja region, since its foundation 400 years ago, had been a geographic, demographic, economic, historical and cultural focus for the Malays.

The Battle 
On November 15, 1861, in the morning, Pope Savo Vujović, with his combat unit, attacked the Lower Muric with the greatest severity. Here, too, a bloody fight took place between two unequal opponents. The Montenegrin forces intended to kill and cut off as many heads of Albanians as possible to loot as many items and various objects, food items, etc. The warriors here too did their work with the greatest ferocity. But many houses in Lower Muriq became impregnable fortresses, for the protection of which the women of Muriq showed special heroism. And in this battle, the Montenegrin forces were badly broken, and Pope Savo Vujović was also killed there, who had told Prince Danilo that "in the first battle, I will either cut off the head of the Turks, or I will be wounded, or I will be killed" and the latter happened to him, was killed precisely in Muriq.

The news about the attack by the Montenegrin forces and the bloody fight in Muriq spread through out the Kraja and Shkodra, from where help also came (the people from Shkodra in boats across Lake Shkodra, while the people from the lower part ran faster and reached Muriq). Reinforcements are also ordered for the Montenegrins. The war didn't continue, there was a stalemate and the Montenegrins took advantage of it to retreat to Krricë and Cermicë.

The people of Šestani did not fight against the Montenegrin attacks even when they attacked Muriq, nor when they withdrew from it, but they killed eight Montenegrins from Orahova who had remained in Lower Šestani.

References

Conflicts in 1861
19th century in Albania
19th century in Montenegro
Battles involving Albania